Der Weibsteufel is a 1966 Austrian drama film directed by Georg Tressler.  It was entered into the 16th Berlin International Film Festival.

Cast
 Maria Emo
 Sieghardt Rupp
 Hugo Gottschlich
 Vera Complojer (as Vera Comployer)
 Richard Tomaselli
 Margarete Reimann
 Gottfried Rieder

See also
 Thy Name Is Woman (1924)
 A Devil of a Woman (1951)

References

External links

1966 films
1966 drama films
1960s German-language films
Austrian drama films
Austrian black-and-white films
Films directed by Georg Tressler
Austrian films based on plays
Films set in the Alps
Remakes of American films